Mickey Mouse and Friends may refer to:

 Mickey Mouse universe, a fictional shared universe featuring the Disney character Mickey Mouse and related characters
 Mickey Mouse (comic book), a comic book series titled Mickey Mouse and Friends from issues #257–303